The 1975 Macdonald Brier, the Canadian men's national curling championship was held from March 2 to 8, 1975 at the Lady Beaverbrook Rink in Fredericton, New Brunswick. The total attendance for the week was 20,672. This was the first Brier in which a combined Territories (Northwest Territories and Yukon) team would participate, increasing the field from 11 to 12 teams. This arrangement would last until  when each territory (Northwest Territories, Nunavut, and Yukon) was granted a separate entry along with a Team Canada entry for the defending Brier champions.

Team Northern Ontario, who was skipped by Bill Tetley captured the Brier tankard as they finished round robin play with a 9–2 record. This was Northern Ontario's first Brier championship since  and their second overall as well as Tetley's only Brier championship. The Tetley rink would go onto represent Canada in the 1975 Air Canada Silver Broom, the men's world curling championship in Perth, Scotland where they would lose in the semifinal to eventual champion Switzerland.

Despite being a longshot to win the Brier (or even compete in general) as a first year entry, the Territories entry from Yukon, who was skipped by Don Twa remained in contention until the final draw of the tournament and eventually finished tied for second overall with an 8–3 record. To date, this is the best Brier finish by any team from the territories.

Teams
The teams were listed as follows:

Round Robin standings
Final Round Robin standings

Round Robin results
All draw times are listed in Atlantic Standard Time (UTC-04:00).

Draw 1
Sunday, March 2, 3:00 pm

Draw 2
Monday, March 3, 9:00 am

Draw 3
Monday, March 3, 2:00 pm

Draw 4
Monday, March 3, 7:30 pm

Draw 5
Tuesday, March 4, 9:00 am

Draw 6
Tuesday, March 4, 2:00 pm

Draw 7
Wednesday, March 5, 2:00 pm

Draw 8
Wednesday, March 5, 7:30 pm

Draw 9
Thursday, March 6, 9:00 am

Draw 10
Thursday, March 6, 2:00 pm

Draw 11
Thursday, March 6, 7:30 pm

Draw 12
Friday, March 7, 2:00 pm

Draw 13
Friday, March 7, 7:30 pm

Draw 14
Saturday, March 8, 2:00 pm

Awards

All-Star Team 
The media selected the following curlers as All-Stars.

Ross G.L. Harstone Award
The Ross Harstone Award was presented to the player chosen by their fellow peers as the curler who best represented Harstone's high ideals of good sportsmanship, observance of the rules, exemplary conduct and curling ability.

References

1975 in New Brunswick
Macdonald Brier, 1975
The Brier
Curling competitions in Fredericton